Datu Patinggi Abang Haji Abdillah College is an elite coeducational day and boarding secondary school located in Kuching, Sarawak, Malaysia. The school is a national secondary school, a government school in which Malay is the main medium of instruction.

History 
Datu Patinggi Abang Haji Abdillah College was officially opened on 29 September 1978 by the third Prime Minister of Malaysia, Tun Hussein Onn. Dubbed the 'Eton of Borneo', the college was formerly known as Datu Patinggi Abang Haji Abdillah Junior Science College. Its original purpose was to serve as a Junior College for Form 6 students who obtained good results in their Form 5 examination. In later years, the college started admitting Form 1 to Form 5 students while still keeping the Kolej (College) prefix. Admission for Form 6 students was halted in 2005.

The plan to build the school was granted by the Federal Government in 1972 under the Second Malaysia Plan (RMK-2). The construction was completed in 1978, covering 8 hectares.

The college was named after Datu Patinggi Abang Haji Abdillah, a local politician who served under Vyner Brooke. He was a well known patriot who opposed the cession of Sarawak to the British Crown in 1946.

Admission 
Admission to the school is monitored and conducted by the State Education Board. Since 2017, after the implementation of both KSSM and KSSR programmes under the KPM, there are no specific minimum requirements to enter the school, instead a student (Form 1) whom applied the admission to this school, with good results in UPSR will be called for an interview.

Principals 
Tuan Haji Adzuddin bin Haji Mantrang was appointed as the 13th Principal of Datu Patinggi Abang Haji Abdillah College on October 2022, succeeding Abang Othman who has served the post since October 2019. Prior to that, Tuan Haji Adzuddin was the principal of Sekolah Menengah Kebangsaan Lundu. He is also the Deputy President of Kesatuan Guru Bumiputera Sarawak (KGBS).

 Datu Putit Matzen (1978-1982)
 Hajah Sukinam Domo (1983-1984)
 Tuan Haji Morshidi Ali (1985-1989)
 Tuan Haji Mohd Zain Abang Ismail (1989-1992)
 Datuk Amar Michael Manyin Jawong (1993-1995)
 Putit bin Haji Ped (1995-2004)
 Datin Hajah Halimah binti Haji Mohd Sahari (2004-2007)
 Johara Zen (2007-2011)
 Hajah Mastura binti Haji Anuar (2011-2015)
 Tuan Haji Ibrahim bin Haji Jamain (2015-2017)
 Catherine Ritikos @ Fiziah Abdullah (2017-2019)
 Abang Othman bin Abang Masagus (2019-2022)
 Tuan Haji Adzuddin bin Haji Mantrang (2022- )

Symbols and traditions 
The college's motto is Arif dan Maju (Wisdom and Progress), which is also the title of one of its two anthems. The second anthem, Arif dan Maju (written by Wan Danial Samiun Bin Wan Mohamad), was introduced during Putit bin Haji Ped's tenure as the Principal when the college was declared a Smart School. However, Pelajar Bestari was replaced by Hearts and Minds during Mdm. Johara Zen's administration in 2007. In 2005, during Datin Halimah's administration, We Must, We Can, We Will Excel was adopted as the college slogan. A popular short phrase was then added to the slogan by Tuan Haji Ibrahim bin Haji Jamain, "We Must, We Can, We Will Excel, Eureka Yes!", which now the slogan is the battle cry for the whole Kolej community.

Sports Houses 
Kolej DPAH Abdillah has four 'houses', each assigned with a particular color (in brackets); Lions (Red), Wallabies (Orange), All Blacks (Black) and Springboks (Green). The houses are named after international rugby teams.

Prior to 2001, the names used were either based on the name of local heroes or patriots; Rentap, Sharif Masahor, Rosli Dhobi and Patinggi Ali (Patali). In 2001, the names of Proton (National) cars were used, namely Waja (Red), Satria (Yellow), Perdana (Blue) and Wira (Green). In 2009, the houses names were changed to the names of four famous Rugby teams from around the world; Lions, Springboks, Wallabies and All Blacks.

Students are assigned to a randomly selected house. Houses compete against each other in the Annual Sports Event and academic competitions like debates.

School publications
The SPEKTRA is the school's official yearbook or annual magazine and is also the longest running school publication. The editorial board consists of students and teachers. However, the main body of the editorial board consists of students. In 2015, SPEKTRA publication was taken over by Kolej DPAH Abdillah Multimedia Club after responsible publisher, which was Mr. Mohd Noor bin Lamat moved out from Kolej to his new school.

Buletin Bestari is the school's official newsletter, published by the Briged Bestari of Kolej Abdillah. It is unclear as to when Briged Bestari started its publication, but it has been said that it was first published since the school opened. For unknown reasons the school stopped publishing Buletin Bestari in the 1990s. The Media and Computer Club published their own newsletter, Owl's in 2004, in an attempt to start a new official newsletter.

In 2005, the extra curricular adviser changed the name and structure of the Media and Computer Club to Briged Bestari, which in result replaced Owl's with the reborn Buletin Bestari. The Buletin Bestari was republished in the same year.

Other publications include newsletters published by the school's own Young Entrepreneurs Program (YEP) companies, such as the From the Eyes of Collegians newsletter.

G News is the production of news by the school and started since 2011. It is shown during the assembly to all the students in the school. G News reports on current issues surrounding the school and the achievements of students in extracurricular or curricular activities. It's now currently had stopped publishing since there is no video editor in the school.

Extracurricular achievements
The school has been competitive in the Young Entrepreneurs Program, and it won several national awards in 2002 and 2005, defeating other schools in Malaysia, two of which are MCKK and Victoria Institution.

Debate and public speaking
Kolej DPAH Abdillah produced great orators in 1980, winning the Chief Minister's Cup Malay Debate Championship. The person in-charge of the Bahasa Malaysia debate team, (Cikgu Bhaludin Salleh) has resigned and opened a well known tuition centre named Pusat Bimbingan Karya.

It was the year 2006 when Kolej DPAH Abdillah won the Sarawak Bahasa Melayu Parliamentary Style Debate. Under the guidance of Cikgu Zaidi and Cikgu Maimunah, the team placed second in the National (Borneo) Bahasa Melayu Parliamentary Style Debate which was held in Labuan.

In 2005, Kolej DPAH Abdillah won the State-level Royal Cup Speech Competition and its representative, Junnyaruin Barat was selected to represent Sarawak in national-level competition.

In 2008, the English Debate team under the guidance of Madam Maria Tan trained with the Debate Team of UiTM Sarawak. UiTM Sarawak was the Borneo Cup Debating Tournament champion for 2006 and 2008, as well as one of the finalists in the Vice-Chancellor Cup Debating Championship in 2007 which was held in Shah Alam. The Kolej Abdillah-UiTM collaboration was funded by the Parents-Teachers Association. The representatives for the year's English Debate was Nalisha Laila [first speaker], Nor Shafiqah [second speaker], Aliff Farhan [third speaker] and Ajibah [reserve].

In 2013, the English Debate team won the Inter-School English Parliamentary Style Debate Competition, Divisional Level. The competition was hosted by SMK Bau. The team then placed 2nd-runner-up in the State level competition held in Limbang. In the same year, the debate team consisting of Joshua Chew [first speaker], Nor Atikah [second speaker] and Azeem Abadi [third speaker] emerged as champions in the Kenyalang Debate Muda Tournament organised by UiTM, Kota Samarahan. Azeem Abadi was awarded the Best Debater in the finals while Joshua Chew was awarded Third Best Speaker of the tournament. Kolej DPAH Abdillah's English Debate team was also the Champion for the National ICT Security Debate : CyberSAFE Challenge Trophy Sarawak Zone. The team represented Sarawak at the National level, making it to 3rd place.

In 2014, the debate team consisting of Joshua Chew [first speaker], Muhammad Rahiman [second speaker] and Azeem Abadi [third speaker] were finalists of the Asian Parliamentary Inter School Debate Competition in Curtin University, Miri. Joshua Chew was awarded the Best Speaker of the final round. Two other students, Nor Atikah and Siti Nurfatihah, participated in the Oratory Competition, which was held concurrently with the debate competition in Curtin University, Miri. Nor Atikah emerged as the champion and Siti Nurfatihah was the 2nd runner up. Earlier in the year, Kolej Abdillah had several teams participating in the Swinburne Sarawak Inter School Debate Championship held in Swinburne University, Kuching. In the Senior category, Team A composed of Joshua Chew, Nor Atikah and Azeem Abadi, qualified for the breaking rounds, breaking 8th, and were quarter finalists of the tournament. Debaters of Kolej Abdillah also participated in open tournaments, such as the Borneo British Parliamentary Debate Competition, held in UNIMAS, Kota Samarahan. Team A were quarter finalists of the tournament.

In 2015, an official Oratory Club was founded.

In 2020, the debate team consisting of Muhammad Abdul Aziz [first speaker], Ameera Nailya [second speaker] and Eddry Haqimy [third speaker] achieved a notable milestone when they became the first collegian debate team to break into the semi-finals of the prestigious Swinburne Sarawak Inter-School Debating Championship (SSIDC), senior category. Two years prior, Muhammad Abdul Aziz and Eddry Haqimy, along with Dayang Azizah as the third speaker paved the way for collegian debate teams by becoming the forerunner among collegian debaters to break further than quarter-finals as juniors. Currently, this is the most notable and accomplished achievements a debate team from the school has ever held, due to the sheer size and competition of SSIDC.

Young Entrepreneurs Programme
The Young Entrepreneurs Programme (YEP) of Kolej DPAH Abdillah is probably the most acclaimed club in Kolej Abdillah. It has represented the state of Sarawak several times.

List of YEP companies
 2002: College Hillz Sdn. Bhd.
 2003: Abdillahz Empire Sdn. Bhd.
 2004: Enigma 42 Sdn. Bhd
 2006: F.L.A.M.E. Sdn. Bhd.
 2014: Avenue Sdn. Bhd.
 2015: A.C.E. Sdn. Bhd.

List of YEP achievements
 2003 - Abdillahz Empire Sdn. Bhd
State Level
Third place in Report Presentation
 2004 - Enigma 42 Sdn. Bhd
State Level
 Best Company Award
 Best Report Presentation
 Best General Manager Award - Syed Nizamuddin bin Sayed Khassim
 Best Administrative Manager Award - Noor Afreeda binti Nawawi
 Best Operational Manage Award - Nor Azwani Adenan
 Best Marketing Manager Award - Normalyana Samsudin
 Best Finance Manager Award - Abdul Hafeedzil Iqbal bin Wajidi
National Level
 Runner-up in Report Presentation Category

Taekwondo
Chong Zhia Howe has been representing Malaysia in international taekwondo tournaments ever since he was a student at the school. As of 2005, the Kolej Abdillah has two taekwondo clubs: the International Taekwon-Do Federation (ITF) and World Taekwondo Federation (WTF). Both taekwondo clubs would collaborate with the school's other martial arts clubs to do martial arts performances on annual sporting events.

Rugby
Rugby was first introduced to the school in 1997. The rugby team was supervised by Cikgu Zulkarnain and trained by Coach Pat, who led the team to victory in the Kuching Division tournament in the same year. After the sole victory, it was rumoured that the players began spending more time in their studies, which resulted in the club's demise in 1999. However, according to trusted sources, the club's downfall was the result of Coach Pat leaving the team to further his studies and leaving no successor to head the team.

The school's rugby team, now known as the 'College Titans', was re-established in 2003 and its players were trained by a rugby player and Form 6 student Azfar Zubri, who once captained the Malaysian U-19 rugby team.  The College Titans became stronger each year and this in return sparked the other students' interest in the sport. Some of the Titans' players were even selected to play for the Kuching division and state teams. The College Titans is now one of the big names in secondary school rugby, along with the competitive team from the SHOAW rugby team.
The School now has a better team called Sharks. The team is divided into 3 sections, which are u-14,u-15, and u-18. Every tournament, the Sharks will always do their best to win. The Sharks never seek for winning because they only wanted to play for fun. The teacher that is currently leading the rugby team is Mr. Zamzy Abdul Rahman.

Dance
Kolej DPAH Abdillah once had a competitive dance group which had won several competitions and was described as one of the best dance teams in Kuching. The group was officially started in 1997 and it took part in the Dance Competition organised by the Sarawak Cultural Village in the same year. For its first appearance in the competition, the group was given the "Kumpulan Harapan" title and brought home "Piala Harapan", which was quite a confidence boost for them as newcomers. The group then immediately became a favourite and received good critics from the judges of the competition. Since then, there were many invitations for the group to perform in big events around Kuching. In the same year, they won a dance competition organised by the Kuching North City Hall (DBKU) on the Kuching City Day (first place for school category - cultural performance). This achievement led the group to practice harder the next year and it was paid off when the group took first place in the Sarawak Cultural Village School dance competition. They also won DBKU's Dance Competition in the same year. In 1999, the senior dancers graduated from school and that left the new dancers struggling to keep their reign as a champions but it proved to be a challenging year for the fresh faces. The newly recruited dancers only managed to take the second or third place in most of the competitions they took part in. In 2000, the group once again recruited new dancers. However, due to problems such as instructor replacements and irregular schedule changes, the group was not able to perform at their best and failed to bag any prizes in any competitions. It was a total meltdown for them but the Kolej DPAH Abdillah Dance Group (now also known as the Kassorga Dancers) had the best dancers in their time. Kolej DPAH Abdillah Dance Group was labelled a 'one hit wonder team' then.

Traditions 
 Students addressed their principal as 'Ayahanda' (Malay for father) or 'Bonda' (Malay for mother). A slight variation was made for Madam Johara Zen, who is referred to as 'Ummi', which translates to mother in Arabic.
 Prior to 2004, the school anthem was played by a student on a piano in every assembly. However, the tradition stopped in 2004. An attempt to revive the tradition by Datin Hajah Halimah was met with failure.
 Madam Johara Zen changed the names for the classes to the names of precious minerals; Indigo (Indigo) to Amethyst, Merah (Red) to Ruby, Biru (Blue) to Sapphire, Kuning (Yellow) to Topaz, Hijau (Green) to Emerald, Putih (White) to Diamond and Jingga (Orange) to Amber (the class does not exist anymore now) in 2007.
 
 The Pelajar Bestari song was replaced with the government-created song; Hearts and Minds by Madam Johara Zen.
 Prior to the principal Haji Ibrahim period, a battle cry, "We Must, We Can, We Will Excel, Eureka Yes", was adopted and will be chanted every time the principal finishes his speech.

Notable alumni 
 Dato' Sri Haji Fadillah bin Yusof, 14th Deputy Prime Minister of Malaysia cum Minister of Plantation & Commodities and Member of Parliament (MP) for P.194 Petra Jaya.
Datuk Ali Biju, former Deputy Minister of Energy and Natural Resources and Member of Parliament for P.205 Saratok.
Tuan Haji Ahmad Johnie Zawawi, Chairman of Indah Water and Member of Parliament for P.207 Igan.
Datuk Hajah Sharifah Hasidah Sayeed Aman Ghazali, State Deputy Minister in Premier Department (Law, MA63 and State-Federal Relations) and Member of Sarawak State Legislative Assembly for N.7 Samariang.
Ir. Aidel bin Lariwoo, State Deputy Minister of Infrastructure & Port Development and Member of Sarawak State Legislative Assembly for N.24 Sadong Jaya.
Billy Sujang, Member of Sarawak State Legislative Assembly for N.01 Opar.
Tuan Haji Mohamad bin Duri, Member of Sarawak State Legislative Assembly for N.38 Kalaka.
Dato' Sri Wan Ahmad Dahlan Haji Abdul Aziz, Director-General of Implementation Coordination Unit (ICU), Prime Minister's Department.
Dato' Amir bin Omar, former Sarawak Federal Secretary.
Dato' Sri Talat Mahmood Abdul Rashid, Sarawak State Attorney-General.
 Datuk Haji Abang Sallehuddin bin Abang Shokeran, 12th Director-General of Dewan Bahasa dan Pustaka (DBP).
 Sutekno Ahmad Belon, 13th Director of National Anti-Drug Agency (AADK).
Datu Ken Leben, Deputy Director-General (Control) of Immigration Department of Malaysia.
 Datu Misnu bin Haji Taha, Chairman of Majlis Islam Sarawak.
 Datu Abdullah bin Julaihi, Director of Land and Survey Sarawak.
 Dato' Sulaiman bin Wak, former Deputy Director-General of Education (Teaching Professionalism Development Sector).
 Dr. Norisah binti Suhaili, Deputy Director-General of Education (School Operations Sector).
 Tuan Haji Adana bin Haji Jed, Director of Sarawak Social Welfare Department.
Rokayah Madon, former Sarawak State Education Director.
 Jack Liam, Deputy Director (Forest Management) of Sarawak Forestry Department.
Dato' Dr. Malike Mahli, prominent local businessman & politician.
 Puan Amelati anak Parnell, Judicial Commissioner of the High Court of Kota Kinabalu.
 Abang Othman bin Abang Masagus, 12th Principal of Kolej Datu Patinggi Abang Haji Abdillah.
 Hassan Busu, former Director of Jabatan Penerangan (JAPEN) Terengganu.
 Dr. Clarence Jerry, Head of Research and Innovation for IPGKTAR's Professionalism of Teacher Education Department.
 Prof. Dr. Othman Bojo, 8th Dean for UNIMAS' Faculty of Resource Science and Technology.
 Prof. Madya Stanley Kiai, Faculty of Social Sciences & Humanities, UNIMAS.
 Puan Marilyn Biyor, SEDC's Division Director for Human Resource and Administration.
 Hamdan bin Mohamad, Head of Communications for AirAsia Group.
 Cr. Abdul Baderi bin Sahmat, Majlis Bandaraya Kuching Selatan (MBKS) Councillor.
 Chong Zhia Howe, represents Malaysia in international Taekwondo tournaments.
 Liong Lai Ling, Director of Angkasa Jurutera Perunding Sdn. Bhd.
 Iswardy Morni, Chairman of Sarawak's Pro-Keadilan of PKR.

Notable educators 
 Datuk Putit Matzen; first Principal, Chairman of Sarawak Islamic Council.
 Dato' Sri Michael Manyin; the fifth Principal, joined politics after leaving, an assemblyman for Tebedu constituency.
 Isai Raja; Arts and Visual teacher, was once a player of Sarawak FA.
 Bhaludin Haji Salleh; a former Malay Language teacher of Kolej Abdillah, established a private tuition centre franchise upon resigning. The private tuition centre; Pusat Bimbingan Karya, specialises in Malay Language studies for primary and secondary school students.

In the media 
Kolej DPAH Abdillah's extra-large Jalur Gemilang was featured in Malaysia's media in year 2002 and 2003.

References 
 "Reminiscing the Glorious Past; Kolej Abdillah since 1979" - OWLs, 10 May 2007
  Spektra Editorial (2005) Spektra 2005
  Spektra Editorial (2004) Spektra 2004'
  Spektra Editorial (2003) Spektra 2003  Spektra Editorial (2002) Spektra 2002  Spektra Editorial (2001) Spektra 2001  Spektra Editorial (2000) Spektra 2000  Spektra Editorial (1999) Spektra 1999  Spektra Editorial (1998) Spektra 1998  Spektra Editorial (1997) Spektra 1997  Spektra Editorial (1996) Spektra 1996  Spektra Editorial (1995) Spektra 1995  Spektra Editorial (1994) Spektra 1994  Spektra Editorial (1980) Spektra 1980  Spektra Editorial (2013) Spektra 2013  Spektra Editorial (2014) Spektra 2014''

Notes

External links 
 School website
 An older version of the official school website
 Myths and facts surrounding the school
 An article on the school's achievement in entrepreneurship programme
 Sarawak's Young Entrepreneurs Programme website and articles on the school's achievements in entrepreneurship

Secondary schools in Sarawak
National secondary schools in Malaysia
Buildings and structures in Kuching
Educational institutions established in 1979
1979 establishments in Malaysia